Henrik Bjerre Øre (born 12 August 1979) is a former Danish cricketer.  Øre is a left-handed batsman who bowls left-arm medium pace.  He was born at Esbjerg, Ribe County.

Øre played a single List A fixture for Denmark in the 2005 Cheltenham & Gloucester Trophy against Northamptonshire.  In his only List A appearance, he was dismissed for a duck by Charl Pietersen and with the ball he took a single wicket at a cost of 28 runs.

References

External links
Henrik Øre at ESPNcricinfo
Henrik Øre at CricketArchive

1979 births
Living people
People from Esbjerg
Danish cricketers
Sportspeople from the Region of Southern Denmark